Hammersmith South was a constituency used for elections to the London County Council between 1919 and 1955.  The seat shared boundaries with the UK Parliament constituency of the same name.  Part was moved into Hammersmith North, and the remainder became part of a new Barons Court constituency.

Councillors

Election results

References

London County Council constituencies
Politics of the London Borough of Hammersmith and Fulham
Hammersmith